Emanuele Santaniello (born 27 January 1990) is an Italian professional footballer who plays as a forward for  club Monopoli.

Club career
Born in Naples, Santaniello started his career in Serie D club Sapri. Made his debut in Serie C for Cavese on the  2010–11 season.

In September 2020, the forward signed for two years at Avellino.

On 18 August 2021, he joined Turris.

On 31 January 2023, Santaniello signed a 1.5-year deal with Monopoli.

References

External links 
 
 
 

1990 births
Living people
Footballers from Naples
Italian footballers
Association football forwards
Serie C players
Serie D players
Cavese 1919 players
A.S.D. Città di Marino Calcio players
S.E.F. Torres 1903 players
Paganese Calcio 1926 players
AZ Picerno players
U.S. Avellino 1912 players
S.S. Turris Calcio players
S.S. Monopoli 1966 players